Pep Biel Mas Jaume (born 5 September 1996) is a Spanish professional footballer who plays as an attacking midfielder or a winger for Super League Greece club Olympiacos.

Club career

Early career
Biel was born in Sant Joan, Majorca, Balearic Islands, and started his career with CE Constància. On 16 December 2012, aged only 16, he made his first team debut by coming on as a second-half substitute in a 0–1 Segunda División B home loss against CE L'Hospitalet.

In 2013 Biel moved to Rayo Vallecano, returning to the youth setup. In July 2015, after finishing his formation and having appeared rarely for the B-team, he joined CD Llosetense also in the third division.

On 14 June 2016, Biel signed for another reserve team, RCD Mallorca B in the third division. On 17 August, however, he was loaned to Tercera División side AD Almudévar for the season.

Zaragoza
On 12 July 2017, Biel agreed to a two-year contract with Real Zaragoza, being assigned to the reserves in the division three. The following 19 January he made his professional debut, replacing Alberto Zapater in a 1–2 away loss against Granada CF in the Segunda División.

On 21 May 2018 Biel renewed his contract until 2022, and was definitely promoted to the first team ahead of the 2018–19 season. He scored his first professional goal on 12 November, netting his team's second in a 3–1 away defeat of Gimnàstic de Tarragona.

A regular starter under new manager Víctor Fernández, Biel scored a brace in a 3–3 draw at Cádiz CF on 8 April 2019. He finished the season with six goals in 21 appearances, as his side avoided relegation.

Copenhagen
On 1 August 2019, Danish Superliga side FC Copenhagen announced that they had agreed a fee with Zaragoza and that Biel would undergo a medical in Denmark with the intention of an immediate transfer. Two days later, he signed a five-year contract with the club.

Biel made his debut abroad on 3 August 2019, replacing Viktor Fischer in a 2–1 away defeat of SønderjyskE.

On 27 February 2020, Biel scored in the final minutes to defeat Scottish champions Celtic and help the club advance to the round of 16 in the Europa League.

On 8 August 2021, Biel scored the final goal in a 4–2 derby win against Brøndby. On 7 September, Biel was named the Superliga Player of the Month for August 2021 after scoring five goals and providing two assists in five matches. On 22 May 2022 with the club he won the Danish Superliga in the season 2021–22 been the first title in his career and he has been elected Copenhagen Player of the Season for the season 2021–22.

Biel started the 2022–23 campaign in strong fashion, scoring four goals in four league games including a hat-trick against rivals Brøndby on 7 August 2022; the first hat-trick ever scored in a Copenhagen Derby.

Career statistics

Honours
Copenhagen
 Danish Superliga: 2021–22

Individual
Copenhagen Player of the Year: 2021–22
UEFA Europa Conference League Top assist provider: 2021–22 (shared)
Danish Superliga Player of the Year: 2021–22
Danish Superliga Player of the Half-Season: 2021–22
Danish Superliga Player of the Month: August 2021
Danish Superliga Team of the Year: 2021–22
Super League Greece Player of the Month: September 2022

References

External links

1996 births
Living people
Footballers from Mallorca
Spanish footballers
Association football midfielders
Segunda División players
Segunda División B players
Tercera División players
CE Constància players
Rayo Vallecano B players
CD Llosetense players
AD Almudévar players
Real Zaragoza B players
Real Zaragoza players
Danish Superliga players
F.C. Copenhagen players
Spanish expatriate footballers
Spanish expatriate sportspeople in Denmark
Expatriate men's footballers in Denmark
Spanish expatriate sportspeople in Greece
Expatriate footballers in Greece